Aega may refer to:

Aega (mythology), several mythological Greek characters
Aega (mayor of the palace) (died 641), the name of a mayor of the palace of Neustria
Aega (crustacean), a genus of isopod crustaceans
Aega (Achaea), a town of ancient Achaea, Greece

See also
Aegan, a 2008 Kollywood film starring Ajith and Nayanthara
Aegae (disambiguation)